Howard Drossin is an American composer for film and video games. His work includes co-scoring with longtime collaborator RZA, The Man with the Iron Fists for Universal Pictures, starring Russell Crowe and Lucy Liu; several award-winning video game titles including Afro Samurai, Splatterhouse, and Baldur's Gate; a Super Bowl commercial; and orchestration on the Grammy-winning jazz record A Tale of God's Will. He has also worked on albums and musical projects with a wide variety of artists including Herbie Hancock, Terence Blanchard, Rod Stewart, The Black Keys, Beyoncé Knowles, Wiz Khalifa, and Paul Oakenfold.

Works

Film and television

Video games

External links
 
 

American film score composers
American male film score composers
Living people
Video game composers
Year of birth missing (living people)